A Starlit Somersault Downhill is a 1993 book by Nancy Willard and illustrator Jerry Pinkney about a rabbit that is invited by a bear to share a cave over winter but instead of hibernating decides to enjoy the outside.

Publication history
1993 A Starlit Somersault Downhill, (Little, Brown and Company)
2011 A Starlit Snowfall, (Little, Brown and Company)

Reception
Publishers Weekly, in a review of A Starlit Somersault Downhill, wrote "Willard's  typically sophisticated language gains meaning through repeated readings, and her sonorous rhyming couplets impart liveliness to nature's sleeping season. Lavishly detailed, full-spread watercolors afford views of untidy woods and tousled fur--they bristle with energy even as they suggest the restlessness youngsters may experience in the deep of night, wide awake and alone." 

A Starlit Somersault Downhill has also been reviewed by Booklist, Kirkus Reviews,
The Horn Book Magazine, School Library Journal, and the Cooperative Children's Book Center.

References

1993 children's books
American children's books
American picture books
American poetry collections
Children's fiction books
Adventure fiction
English-language books
Books about rabbits and hares
Books about bears
Talking animals in fiction
Literary duos
California in fiction
Forests in fiction
Winter in culture
Picture books by Jerry Pinkney